Seven Years in Tibet: My Life Before, During and After (1952; ; 1954 in English) is an autobiographical travel book written by Austrian mountaineer Heinrich Harrer based on his real life experiences in Tibet between 1944 and 1951 during the Second World War and the interim period before the Communist Chinese People's Liberation Army invaded Tibet in 1950.

Plot
The book covers the escape of Harrer and his companion, Peter Aufschnaiter, from a British internment camp in India. Harrer and Aufschnaiter then traveled across Tibet to Lhasa, the capital. Here they spent several years, and Harrer describes the contemporary Tibetan culture in detail. Harrer subsequently became a tutor and friend of the 14th Dalai Lama.

It has been said that the book "provided the world with a final glimpse of life in an independent Tibetan state prior to the Chinese invasion."

Publication
Seven Years in Tibet was translated into 53 languages, became a bestseller in the United States in 1954, and sold three million copies.

At the beginning of the Flamingo edition of the book, a message from the 14th Dalai Lama praises the work: "Harrer has always been such a friend to Tibet. His most important contribution to our cause, his book, Seven Years in Tibet, introduced hundreds of thousands of people to my country." When Harrer died in 2006, the Dalai Lama repeated his praise of the author and sent a message of sympathy to Harrer's widow.

Films
Two films have been based on the book: Seven Years in Tibet (1956), a 76-minute documentary directed by Hans Nieter which includes both movies shot by Harrer during his stay in Tibet and various scenes from his adventures reconstructed by Harrer himself, and Seven Years in Tibet (1997), directed by Jean-Jacques Annaud and starring Brad Pitt as Harrer and David Thewlis as Aufschnaiter.

Song
There is also a David Bowie song entitled "Seven Years in Tibet", from his album Earthling (1997).

References

External links
 Copy of the book on the Internet Archive
 

1952 non-fiction books
Travel books
Tibetan Buddhist art and culture
Memoirs of imprisonment
Austrian books
Books about Tibet
Non-fiction books adapted into films
Cultural depictions of the 14th Dalai Lama
Austrian autobiographies
Books about India
Rupert Hart-Davis books